This is a list of trolleybus systems in Germany by Land.  It includes all trolleybus systems, past and present.  A city name in bold indicates a presently existing system.

Baden-Württemberg

Bavaria

Berlin and Brandenburg

Bremen

Hamburg

Hesse

Lower Saxony

North Rhine-Westphalia

Rhineland-Palatinate

Saarland

Saxony

Saxony-Anhalt

Schleswig-Holstein

Thuringia

Towns in historic East Prussia, West Prussia, Lower Silesia and Brandenburg that are no longer part of Germany:
 Allenstein: see Olsztyn, Poland
 Breslau: see Wrocław, Poland
 Danzig: see Gdańsk, Poland
 Insterburg: see Chernyakhovsk, Russia
 Landsberg an der Warthe: see Gorzów (Wielkopolski), Poland
 Liegnitz: see Legnica, Poland
 Waldenburg: see Walbrzych, Poland

See also
 List of trolleybus systems, for all other countries
 Trolleybus
  Oberleitungsbus
 Trolleybus usage by country
 List of town tramway systems in Germany
 List of light-rail transit systems
 List of rapid transit systems

Sources

References

Books and periodicals
 
 
 
 Trolleybus Magazine (ISSN 0266-7452). National Trolleybus Association (UK). Bimonthly.
 Blickpunkt Strassenbahn. Arbeitsgemeinschaft Blickpunkt Strassenbahn e.V. (Germany). Bimonthly.

External links

Germany
 
Trolleybus systems